The Battle of Honey Hill was the third battle of Sherman's March to the Sea, fought November 30, 1864, during the American Civil War. It did not involve Major General William T. Sherman's main force, marching from Atlanta to Savannah, Georgia, but was a failed Union Army expedition under Brig. Gen. John P. Hatch that attempted to cut off the Charleston and Savannah Railroad in support of Sherman's projected arrival in Savannah.

Engagement

Hatch's expeditionary force left Hilton Head, South Carolina, for Boyd’s Neck (above Beaufort) on November 28. It consisted of 5,000 men—two brigades of the Coast Division of the Department of the South, one naval brigade, and portions of three batteries of light artillery. They steamed up the Broad River in transports to cut the Charleston and Savannah Railroad near Pocotaligo. Due to a heavy fog the troops were not disembarked from the transports until late the following afternoon, and Hatch immediately started forward to cut the railroad near Grahamville.

However, the expedition maps and guides proved worthless and Hatch was unable to proceed on the right road until the morning of November 30. At Honey Hill, a few miles from Grahamville, he encountered a Confederate force of regulars and militia, under Col. Charles J. Colcock, with a battery of seven guns across the road. Determined attacks were launched by U.S. Colored Troops including a brigade led by Alfred S. Hartwell that included the 54th Massachusetts and 55th Massachusetts. The position of the Federal force was such that only one section of artillery could be used at a time, and the Confederates were too well entrenched to be dislodged. Fighting kept up until dark when Hatch, realizing the impossibility of successfully attacking or turning the flank of the enemy, withdrew to his transports at Boyd’s Neck, having lost 89 men killed, 629 wounded, and 28 missing. The Confederate casualties amounted to eight killed and 39 wounded.

Captains George E. Gouraud and Thomas F. Ellsworth as well as First Lt. Orson W. Bennett were awarded the Medal of Honor. In 2001 another medal was awarded posthumously to then Corporal Andrew J. Smith.

Union order of battle

BG John P. Hatch

Confederate order of battle
MG Gustavus W. Smith
Col Charles J. Colcock

Chief of Artillery: Col Ambrosio José Gonzales

Casualties
In a report of Hatch December 1864 summarized the Union losses:

 1st Brigade: casualties of 2 officers and 54 men killed;28 officers and 409 men wounded; 1 officer and 14 men missing.
 2nd Brigade: casualties of 3 officers and 28 men killed;10 officers and 160 men wounded; 1 officer and 8 men missing.
 Naval Brigade: casualties of 1 man killed; 7 men wounded; 4 men missing
 Artillery Brigade: casualties of 1 officer killed; 2 officers and 12 men wounded
 Cavalry: casualties of 1 man wounded

The Confederate losses were reported by Lt Col C.C. Jones in his Siege of Savannah as 4 killed and 40 wounded. The Savannah Republican newspaper on Dec 1, 1864 reported "between eighty and one hundred killed and wounded"

See also
Honey Hill-Boyd's Neck Battlefield

Notes

References
 
 Roster of the Twenty Fifth Ohio Infantry Regiment
 
 National Park Service battle description
 Eicher, David J., The Longest Night: A Military History of the Civil War, Simon & Schuster, 2001, .
 The Union Army; A History of Military Affairs in the Loyal States, 1861–65—Records of the Regiments in the Union Army—Cyclopedia of Battles—Memoirs of Commanders and Soldiers, Federal Publishing Company (Madison, Wisconsin), 1908 (reprinted by Broadfoot Publishing, 1997).
 CWSAC Report Update

External links
 Official records of Civil War search engine
 Eye witness accounts by Captain Luther Mesnard of Company B of OH 25th

1864 in South Carolina
African Americans in the American Civil War
Battles of the Western Theater of the American Civil War
Confederate victories of the American Civil War
Conflicts in 1864
Jasper County, South Carolina
Sherman's March to the Sea
Battles of the American Civil War in South Carolina
United States Marine Corps in the 18th and 19th centuries
November 1864 events